The View from Greenhaven is a 2008 Australian comedy-drama film directed by Kenn and Simon MacRae, starring Chris Haywood and Wendy Hughes.

Cast
 Chris Haywood as Dashiell
 Wendy Hughes as Dorothy
 Susan Prior as Kate
 Russell Dykstra as Tim
 Edward Wills as Terry
 Nathan Cameron as Harry
 Angie Diaz as Sarah
 Rhonda Doyle as Sylvia
 Adam Ray as Bob
 Geoff Morrell as Theodore
 John Gregg as Tobe
 Steve Bisley as Lach

Release
The film was released on 16 October 2008.

Reception
Annette Basile of FilmInk wrote that the film "will put a smile on your face and make its way into your heart." George Palathingal of The Sydney Morning Herald wrote that "With any luck, the MacRaes will think their next project through more carefully. It's all well and good knowing how to tell a story; it's another matter getting people to pay attention."

Jake Wilson of The Age called the film "thinly imaged though efficiently constructed". Jason Di Rosso of Radio Australia wrote that while Haywood and Hughes are "good in the lead roles", the rest of the characters "just aren't original or interesting enough" and the "emotional watershed at the end, too, feels a little simplistic."

References

External links
 
 

Australian comedy-drama films
2008 comedy-drama films